Lianne Joan Sanderson (born 3 February 1988) is a current broadcaster and former English professional footballer who played as a forward. She won 50 caps for the England national team.

At international level, Sanderson made her debut for England in May 2006. She was part of the England squad at the 2007 FIFA Women's World Cup and UEFA Women's Euro 2009. In August 2010, Sanderson complained of unfair treatment and declared she would not play for England again under then coach Hope Powell. After Mark Sampson took over as manager in December 2013, she was recalled to the squad and participated at the 2015 FIFA Women's World Cup. She then made further complaints of unfair treatment and was not selected after 2015.

Early life
At the age of six, Sanderson started playing for a boys' team in South London. Her father played for Crystal Palace. Sanderson says she begged her father to let her play on a team starting at the age of five years old. At nine years old, Sanderson signed for Arsenal.

Club career

Arsenal

Sanderson joined Arsenal in 1997 as part of their youth programme. Her first full season with the first team came in the 2003–2004 season, and she continued to play in the first team from then on. In the 2006 FA Women's Cup final, Sanderson scored the fifth goal of a 5–0 win over Leeds United, and was voted Player of the Match.

Sanderson finished the 2006–07 season as Arsenal's top–scorer, with 40 goals scored in 41 appearances across four competitions, all of which were won by Arsenal. In the 2007–08 season, she amassed 51 goals in 36 appearances, including the third in Arsenal's 4–1 FA Women's Cup final triumph over Leeds United.

Chelsea
On 3 July 2008, Sanderson and Arsenal teammate Anita Asante joined Chelsea Ladies. Upon signing, Sanderson said: "I always said I would never play for anyone else other than Chelsea. I have been at Arsenal for 11 years and it is a big change for me to have to leave the team, but both Anita and I wanted a new challenge. Sometimes you have to try new things and challenge yourself personally and I know that is what I am looking forward to doing here. So now I am just looking forward to what's ahead. Hopefully Anita and I will come in and help Chelsea win things." Arsenal manager Vic Akers publicly criticised the players for the manner of their departure: "You think you've the respect of players, and then they do that. It's a sorry state of affairs."

Philadelphia Independence

Sanderson was drafted in the WPS international draft, and joined Philadelphia Independence. She indicated that a delay in the creation of the FA WSL was behind her move to the United States. In two seasons in the WPS she scored eight goals.

Espanyol
Following the end of the 2011 WPS season, Sanderson signed for Espanyol, in the Spanish league.

D.C. United
In May 2012, she joined W-League side D.C. United Women along with Philadelphia Independence and Espanyol teammate, Joanna Lohman.

Boston Breakers
In 2013, Lianne Sanderson signed with Boston Breakers to play in the new National Women's Soccer League. Sanderson and Lohman went on loan to Cypriot club Apollon Limassol after the American season had finished, to play in the UEFA Women's Champions League.

Arsenal
In November 2014, Sanderson re-signed with her original club, Arsenal Ladies. Her second spell with the club ended on 10 July 2015 after eight months.

Portland Thorns FC
In August 2015, it was announced that Sanderson would join Portland Thorns FC. She made her debut as a second-half substitute for compatriot Jodie Taylor in a 2–1 victory against the Chicago Red Stars on 9 August 2015. After starting two of five appearances for Portland that season, Sanderson headed out on another off-season loan to Apollon Limassol of Cyprus.

Orlando Pride
The expansion Orlando Pride selected Sanderson with the 7th pick of the 2015 NWSL Expansion Draft, joining Alex Morgan and Kaylyn Kyle as fellow Orlando acquisitions from Portland. Sanderson was the first player to score a goal at home for the franchise, on a free kick in the 56th minute of the Pride's home opener on 23 April 2016. By the time she was traded away from the Pride before week 10 of the season in June 2016, Sanderson had two goals and an assist, tying Morgan on both counts despite playing half as many minutes and attempting 22 fewer shots.

Western New York Flash 
In June 2016, Sanderson was traded from the Orlando Pride to the Western New York Flash in exchange for an international spot through 2018. The Flash won the NWSL Championship in 2016. However, Sanderson's season ended when she tore the ACL and meniscus in her right knee on 17 September, while playing for the Flash in a friendly against Thailand.

Since the team was relocated to North Carolina, she has not participated in any team practices or training camps, possibly taking the time to continue to rehab her injury. She was not listed on any of the pre-season roster cuts for the North Carolina Courage 2017 season and social media accounts reflect that she is residing in Limassol, Cyprus and may be involved in coaching and training activities with her previous club, Apollon Limassol.

Juventus
In July 2018, Sanderson joined Juventus. After one season, in which she made two league appearances as Juventus won the Serie A title and the Coppa Italia, she left the club.

Retirement
Sanderson subsequently retired from professional football and pursue a career in media, becoming analyst and commentator for many platforms.

International career
Sanderson has played for England at the Under-15, 17, 19 and 21 levels. On 3 May 2006, she was called up for the England first team. She hit the crossbar with a shot from 25 yards, shortly after coming off the bench for her debut against Hungary. She was drafted into the squad for the World Cup qualifying play-off against France in September 2006 as a replacement for the injured Jo Potter.

She scored her first senior goal in England's 4–0 Euro 2009 qualifier win against Northern Ireland on 13 May 2007. It was her fifth cap.

On 16 August 2010, Sanderson announced that she no longer wanted to be considered for England duty while manager Hope Powell was in charge, due to perceived unfair treatment by both the England hierarchy and Powell.

Sanderson was not included in the England squad for the 2011 FIFA Women's World Cup or the Great Britain squad for the 2012 London Olympics, which was also selected by Powell. Sanderson continued to publicly criticise Powell's administration: "I felt the [England set-up] wanted people like robots who would literally do everything they asked you to do."

After England's unexpectedly poor performance at UEFA Women's Euro 2013, Powell was sacked by The Football Association (FA). A report in The Guardian newspaper suggested that "the wheels first began to come off" when Sanderson left the team. When Katie Chapman withdrew from selection in 2011 after a dispute with disciplinarian Powell, England had lost two of their most talented players, both to off-field issues.

Sanderson rejoined the England squad under Mark Sampson, scoring the winning goal as England won the 2015 Cyprus Cup and winning the penalty that achieved England third place at the 2015 FIFA Women's World Cup. Shortly afterwards, she began complaining again about being expected to "conform" by the FA and about not getting enough acclaim for her 50th cap.

International goals
Scores and results list England's goal tally first

Honours

Arsenal
FA Women's Premier League National Division: 2003–04, 2004–05, 2005–06, 2006–07, 2007–08
FA Women's Cup: 2003–04, 2005–06, 2006–07, 2007–08
FA Women's Premier League Cup: 2004–05, 2006–07
FA Women's Community Shield: 2004–05, 2005–06
UEFA Women's Cup: 2006–07

Juventus
Serie A: 2018–19
Coppa Italia: 2018–19

England
UEFA Women's Championship runner-up: 2009
Cyprus Cup: 2009, 2015
FIFA Women's World Cup third place: 2015

Personal life
Sanderson is openly gay. In 2014, she was engaged to then-teammate Joanna Lohman, but the two later broke up. Sanderson embarked on a relationship with another teammate, Ashley Nick, when they were housed in shared accommodation provided by Apollon Limassol. "We just fell in love organically, with no drama involved," Sanderson claimed. She is a lifelong supporter of Manchester United.

References

External links
 
 
 

1988 births
2015 FIFA Women's World Cup players
Apollon Ladies F.C. players
Arsenal W.F.C. players
Women's association football forwards
Boston Breakers players
Chelsea F.C. Women players
D.C. United Women players
England women's international footballers
English expatriate sportspeople in Spain
English expatriate sportspeople in the United States
Expatriate sportspeople in Italy
FA Women's National League players
British LGBT footballers
English LGBT sportspeople
Living people
National Women's Soccer League players
Philadelphia Independence players
Primera División (women) players
RCD Espanyol Femenino players
Sportspeople from Watford
Expatriate women's footballers in Spain
Expatriate women's footballers in Cyprus
Expatriate women's soccer players in the United States
Lesbian sportswomen
Portland Thorns FC players
Orlando Pride players
Western New York Flash players
English women's footballers
Juventus F.C. (women) players
2007 FIFA Women's World Cup players
Women's Professional Soccer players